Soames may refer to:

People
 Arthur Granville Soames, OBE (1886–1962), a member of HM's Coldstream Guards and father of Christopher Soames, Baron Soames
 Arthur Wellesley Soames, (1852–1934), a British Liberal politician and architect and son of William Aldwin Soames
 A. Soames (fl. 1899–1902), a South African cricket umpire
 Christopher Soames, Baron Soames (1920–1987), known more commonly as Lord Soames, a British cabinet minister and the last governor of Rhodesia
 David Soames, (born 1984), an English footballer
 Emma Soames (born 1949), a British editor and daughter of Baron Soames
 Henry Soames (1843–1913), an English cricketer and son of William Aldwin Soames
 Henry Soames (historian) (1785–1860), an English clergyman and ecclesiastical historian
 Jacqueline Soames (born 1968), a British figure skater
 Jane Soames (1900–1988), a British-born author, translator, and historian
 Mary Soames, Baroness Soames (1922–2014), daughter of Winston Churchill and wife of Baron Soames
 Nicholas Soames (born 1948), a British Conservative MP and son of Baron Soames
 Rupert Soames (born 1959), a British businessman and son of Baron Soames
 Sally Soames (1937–2019), British newspaper photographer
 Scott Soames (born 1946), an American philosopher
 William Aldwin Soames, founder of Brighton College and father of Arthur Wellesley and Henry and William
 William Soames (1850–1916), an English cricketer and son of William Aldwin Soames

Fiction
 Captain Soames, police captain in 1992 horror movie Sleepwalkers
 Dudley Soames, the real name of the supervillain Torque of the DC Comics Nightwing
 "Enoch Soames", a short story by the British writer Max Beerbohm
 Hilton Soames, a character in The Adventure of the Three Students, a Sherlock Holmes story by Sir Arthur Conan Doyle
 John Soames, title character of The Mind of Mr. Soames, a 1970 British film
 Soames Forsyte, protagonist of The Forsyte Saga
 Tildie Soames, a mutant in the Marvel Universe
 Characters in the British soap opera Coronation Street:
 Alison Soames, Kirsty Soames mother
 Edwin Soames,  Kirsty Soames' father
 Kirsty Soames

See also
Soame (disambiguation)

es:Sōami